Rajakumari  is a village in Idukki district in the Indian state of Kerala.

Demographics
As of 2011 Census, Rajakumari had a population of 16,253 with 8,127 males and 8,126 females. In Rajakumari, 8.8% of the population was under 6 years of age. Rajakumari had an average literacy of 89.5% higher than the national average of 74% and lower than state average of 94%.

Economy
Rajakumari is one of the few places in Kerala where all kinds of crops are grown. The main Cultivations of Rajakumari are  cardamom and pepper.

Education Institutions

References

Villages in Idukki district